Total Life Forever is the second studio album by British indie rock band Foals, released on 10 May 2010 through Transgressive Records. Prior to the album's release, the band described it as sounding "like the dream of an eagle dying". It was produced by Luke Smith, and was recorded at Svenska Grammofon Studion in Gothenburg. Upon its release, the album charted in numerous countries worldwide, including number eight in the UK Albums Chart.

Promotion and release
 In January 2009, the band released three semi-instrumental segments of tracks through the band's MySpace profile, giving an insight into the band's recording process. A short three date tour of the United Kingdom took place in April 2009.

During July 2009, the band played an intimate show for Rockfeedback, as a warm up for future festival shows and a chance to debut songs from their second album. On 2 July, the band supported Blur during their reunion show in Hyde Park, London, playing an untitled new song which frontman Yannis Philippakis stated was unfinished. Later the same month, the band appeared at the 2009 T in the Park festival, performing new songs "Total Life Forever" and "Dirty Waves". Both songs had been previously aired during the band's appearance at The Breeders-curated All Tomorrow's Parties festival in May 2009. In September 2009, the band performed at London's Heaven as part of Transgressive Records' fifth anniversary, performing new songs "Spanish Sahara", "Death Surf" and one other untitled track.

The album's title was revealed on 24 February 2010. Zane Lowe premiered the promotional track "Spanish Sahara" on BBC Radio 1, naming the track his "Hottest Record in the World" for 1 March 2010. From 8pm the same day, a remix of the track was made available to download from Foals' official website. The accompanying video was added to Foals' YouTube page on 2 March 2010. A limited number vinyl of "Spanish Sahara" was released on 17 April 2010, to mark the 2010 Record Store Day. In support of the album, the band announced a fourteen date tour of Europe throughout April–May 2010, including dates in Paris, Amsterdam, Berlin and the United Kingdom. These were the band's first live performances of the year.

Following "Spanish Sahara"'s limited release, the album's first official single was announced as "This Orient", released on 3 May 2010. The track reached number 97 on the UK Singles Chart. Second single "Miami" was then released on 4 July 2010. It reached No. 127 on the same chart. Third single "Blue Blood" was released on 8 November 2010.

Reception

Total Life Forever was very well received; many commented how the band's music has matured from their debut album. Review aggregator Metacritic gave the album a normalised rating of 78 out of 100, indicating "generally favourable reviews".

Q magazine's Rupert Howe was more reserved in his praise. Calling it "the schizophrenic second album", Howe opined that "while this album carries more instrumental and emotional heft than its predecessor, something remains off-balance".

Besides being shortlisted for the 2010 Mercury Prize, Total Life Forever brought the band several nominations for the 2011 NME awards, including best album, best track ("Spanish Sahara") and best album artwork.

Accolades

Track listing

Personnel
Foals
Yannis Philippakis – vocals, guitar, drums
Jack Bevan – drums
Jimmy Smith – guitar
Walter Gervers – bass, backing vocals
Edwin Congreave – keyboard, backing vocals

Additional musicians
Caroline Wickberg – additional vocals on "Black Gold" and "This Orient"

Technical personnel
Foals – art direction
Big Active – artwork
Foals – artwork
Tinhead – artwork
Ferg Peterkin – engineering, programming
Stephen Marcussen – mastering
Steve Gullick – photography
Dave Ma – photography
Luke Smith – producer
Mike Crossey – producer, recording assistant on "Blue Blood"
Daniel Rejmer – engineering on "Spanish Sahara"
Catherine Marks – engineering, mixing on "Spanish Sahara"
Alan Moulder – mixing on "Spanish Sahara"

Charts

Weekly charts

Year-end charts

Certifications

References

External links
 Total Life Forever Official Website

2010 albums
Foals (band) albums
Sub Pop albums
Transgressive Records albums
Music in Oxford